Stumpy Point is an unincorporated community in Dare County, North Carolina, United States. The community is located at the intersection of US 264 and Bayview Drive; along the north side of Stumpy Point Bay.  It is surrounded by the Alligator River National Wildlife Refuge.

A post office called Stumpy Point that had been in operation since 1876 closed in 2018 due to lack of PO box holders  The community takes its name from Stumpy Point Bay.

The North Carolina Ferry System maintains an emergency ferry terminal at Stumpy Point, used when a hurricane or tropical storm closes North Carolina Highway 12 on the Outer Banks.

The town is mentioned in the sci-fi novel Ender's Game by Orson Scott Card, in which the little town is razed sometime in the future to build a spaceport in Pamlico Sound, and the spaceport is unofficially named after Stumpy Point.

Education
Residents are zoned to Dare County Schools. Zoned schools include Manteo Elementary School, Manteo Middle School, and Manteo High School.

References

Unincorporated communities in Dare County, North Carolina
Unincorporated communities in North Carolina